Deh-e Tah (also Romanized as Deh Teh; also known as Dahtah, Deh Nah, and Dehtā) is a village in Kavir Rural District, Deyhuk District, Tabas County, South Khorasan Province, Iran. At the 2006 census, its population was 41, in 16 families.

References 

Populated places in Tabas County